Two ships of the Royal Navy have borne the name HMS Driver:

Between 1822 and 1825 Driver served in the West Africa Squadron and succeeded in capturing a Spanish slave ship. Beginning in 1825 she was used as a convict ship, and was broken up in 1834.
  was a wooden paddle sloop launched in 1840.  She was wrecked in 1861 near Mariguana Island.

Source
 

Royal Navy ship names